Masked owl or masked-owl refers to various owls in the genus Tyto, including:

 Australian masked owl (Tyto novaehollandiae)
 Tasmanian masked owl (Tyto novaehollandiae castanops)
 Golden masked owl (Tyto aurantia)
 Manus masked owl (Tyto manusi)
 Minahasa masked owl (Tyto inexspectata)
 Moluccan masked owl (Tyto sororcula)
 Taliabu masked owl (Tyto nigrobrunnea)

Bird common names